Robert Kahn (21 July 1865 – 29 May 1951) was a German composer, pianist, and music teacher.

Life
Kahn was born in Mannheim, the second son of Bernhard Kahn and Emma Eberstadt. One of his seven siblings was the wealthy financier Otto Kahn whose son Roger Wolfe Kahn was a successful jazz musician, composer and aviator. His parents belonged to a distinguished German-Jewish family of bankers and merchants. In 1882, Kahn entered the Königlichen Hochschule für Musik in Berlin, where he studied for the next three years. Between 1885 and 1886, he continued his musical education under the tutelage of Josef Rheinberger in Munich. On a visit to Vienna the following year, Kahn met and befriended composer Johannes Brahms, who offered to make Kahn his pupil. Although Kahn declined the invitation out of diffidence, Brahms's music would exert a profound influence on his compositional style throughout his career.

After finishing his military service, Kahn worked as a freelance composer in Berlin until 1890. For the next three years he was employed as a Korrepetitor (rehearsal pianist) at the Stadttheater in Leipzig. Having been appointed lecturer in composition at his alma mater in 1894, Kahn went on to train some of the best-known musicians of the 20th century. His students include the pianists Arthur Rubinstein and Wilhelm Kempff, the conductor Ferdinand Leitner, the composers Theodore Holland, Nikos Skalkottas and Günter Raphael, and the violinist Karl Klinger.

While Kahn was composing and teaching in Berlin he also was active as chamber musician and Lied accompanist in concert with leading soloists and singers of his time, ranging from Joseph Joachim and Richard Mühlfeld to Adolf Busch, from Johann Messchaert to Ilona Durigo and Emmy Destinn.

In 1916, Kahn was elected to the Prussian Academy of Arts, a membership he held until 1934 when the Nazi regime ordered him to resign because he was Jewish. The Nazis also prohibited the publication and performance of his music. This drove him, at the age of 73, to leave Germany for England in 1939 with his wife Katharina, where (as with many émigré musicians of the period) he spent the last years of his life in relative obscurity but composing prolifically. He lived in Ashtead, Surrey and in Biddenden, Kent, where he died. Kahn and his music were almost entirely forgotten after World War II, but are being rediscovered by musicians and audiences, as is the case of many other composers of "degenerate music" persecuted by the Nazis.

Works
Kahn composed a vast quantity of chamber music, writing in an intimate, lyrical style that is reminiscent of Felix Mendelssohn, Robert Schumann, and Brahms. He was also an admirer of Reger. But aside from the Serenade Aus der Jugendzeit ("From Youth") and the Konzertstück, Op. 74 for piano and orchestra in E flat minor, he mostly avoided the large scale orchestral forms and emotional extravagance of late Romanticism. There are a number of ambitious works for chorus and orchestra, such as the Geothe setting Mahomets Gesang, Op. 24 (1896), the Sturmlied, Op. 53 for chorus, orchestra and organ (1910), and the Festgesang, Op. 64 for the same forces.

Of the chamber music there are three violin sonatas, two cello sonatas, four piano trios, two string quartets, three piano quartets and two piano quintets. Particularly notable are the Violin Sonata in E, Op. 50 (1907), the Piano Quartets, Op. 30 (1899) and Op. 41 (1904), and the String Quartet in A minor, Op. 60 (1914). The unconventionally scored Quintet in C minor of 1911 (for piano, violin, cello, clarinet and horn, the same combination used by Vaughan Williams in 1897), has been recorded. Lieder was also very important to Kahn: he composed around 180 solo songs and 13 duets.

Kahn was often commissioned to create works for some of the finest musicians of the early decades of the 20th century up to the young Adolf Busch with whom Kahn gave the first performance of his Suite, Op. 69 for violin and piano in 1920. His first Violin Sonata in G minor (1886) was dedicated to Joseph Joachim who asked to perform it when Kahn was still a young student in Berlin. Clara Schumann mentioned this sonata in her diary. The second Violin Sonata, in A minor, Op. 26 (1897) was dedicated to Joachim, while the String Quartet No. 1 in A major, Op. 8 (1889) was dedicated to and first performed by the Joachim Quartet. The second string quartet was premièred by the Klingler Quartet, successor of the Joachim. His Clarinet Trio, Op. 45 was dedicated to and performed by the famous clarinetist Richard Mühlfeld who also inspired Brahms's late chamber compositions. Hans von Bülow conducted the Berlin Philharmonic Orchestra in the world première of Kahn's orchestral serenade in 1890.

His renewed compositional activity after leaving Germany in 1938 resulted in a large collection of piano music, including more than 1,100 pieces. These took the form of a musical diary, the Tagebuch in Tönen, begun in 1935, with Kahn writing several short piano works per week until his death in 1951. Apart from an extracted set of 29, these only exist in manuscript at the Akademie der Künste in Berlin. The pianist Maksim Štšura has recorded a selection, as has Danny Driver.

Bibliography
 Helmuth Rilling: "From Johannes Brahms to Robert Kahn: 1887", in: Bach, VI, 4, October 1975, p. 20-22.
 Charlotte Erwin and Eric Levi: "Kahn, Robert", in The New Grove Dictionary of Music and Musicians, ed. Stanley Sadie and John Tyrrell (London: Macmillan, 2001).

See also
 List of émigré composers in Britain

References

External links
 Website about life and Music of Robert Kahn
 LexM Article (in german): Robert Kahn (by Steffen Fahl 2009)
 Lyrics of selected songs
 Robert Kahn's Chamber Music Soundbites and discussion of several works
 Tagebuch in Tönen No. 53, performed by Maksim Štšura, piano
 

1865 births
1951 deaths
19th-century German musicians
19th-century German male musicians
20th-century British musicians
20th-century classical composers
20th-century German composers
20th-century German male musicians
German classical pianists
German male classical composers
German male pianists
German Romantic composers
Jewish classical composers
Jewish classical pianists
Jewish emigrants from Nazi Germany to the United Kingdom
Male classical pianists
People from Biddenden
Musicians from Mannheim
People from the Grand Duchy of Baden